IPI (Interested party information) is a unique identifying number assigned by the CISAC database to each Interested Party in collective rights management. It is used worldwide by more than 120 countries and three million right holders.

Two types of IPI-numbers exist, an IPI Name Number and IPI Base Number.

IPI Name Number
The IP Name Number is the code for a name or pseudonym related to an entity (natural person or a legal entity). One entity can have several names. Prince for example has the IPI-codes
00045620792 (Nelson Prince Rogers), 00052210040 (Prince) and 00334284961 (Nelson Prince R).

The IPI Name Number is composed of eleven numeric digits.

IPI Base Number
The IPI Base Number is the code for a natural person or a legal entity. It has the pattern H-NNNNNNNNN-C.
 H: header (a single letter)
 N: identification number (nine numeric digits)
 C: check digit (a single number)

For example Pablo Picasso has the IP Base Number I-001068130-6.

History
In October 2001, the IPI database replaced the CAE numbers.

Relation with ISWC-numbers
IPI codes are connected with International Standard Musical Work Codes (ISWC). This IPI number can then be used to find all other works by him.

Roles
In relation to ISWC each party has at least one role. Roles can be:
A: Author, Writer, Lyricist
AD: Adaptor
AM: Administrator
AR: Arranger
AQ: Acquirer
C: Composer
CA: Composer/Author
E: Original Publisher
ES: Substitute Publisher
PA: Publisher Income Participant
PR: Associated Performer
SA: Sub-Author
SE: Sub-Publisher
SR: Sub-Arranger
TR: Translator

The standards describe the person who adapts music as an arranger, and the person who adapts the text of a musical work to be an adapter.

References

External links
 The ISWC database

Collective rights